Drosophila quinaria is a species of fruit fly in the Drosophila quinaria species group. Most Quinaria group species feed largely on mushrooms. However D. quinaria instead eats decaying vegetative matter, a trait it evolved independently.

References

Further reading

 

quinaria
Articles created by Qbugbot
Insects described in 1866